Moodu Mulla Bandham is a 1980 Telugu-language drama film, produced by Rangana Aswartha Narayana and Poonathota Raghuram under the Gomatha Art Creations banner and directed by Muthyala Subbaiah. It stars Sarath Babu, Madhavi and Rajendra Prasad , with music composed by Satyam.

Cast
 Sarath Babu as Doctor
 Madhavi as Radha
 Rajendra Prasad as Murali
 Vijayakala as Padma

Soundtrack

Music was composed by Satyam. Lyrics were written by C. Narayana Reddy. Music was released on SEA Records Audio Company.

References

External links

1980 films
Indian drama films
Films scored by Satyam (composer)
1980s Telugu-language films
Films directed by Muthyala Subbaiah
Films about marriage